Fraser Tolmie  is a Canadian politician who was elected to represent the riding of Moose Jaw—Lake Centre—Lanigan in the House of Commons of Canada in the 2021 Canadian federal election.

Prior to his election to Parliament, Tolmie served as mayor of Moose Jaw, Saskatchewan.

References

External links

Living people
Year of birth missing (living people)
Members of the House of Commons of Canada from Saskatchewan
Conservative Party of Canada MPs
21st-century Canadian politicians
Mayors of Moose Jaw